John D. Brown is an American author who writes thrillers and epic fantasy.

Personal life 
Brown was born in Utah and spent many years working in his family's floral and nursery business. He served as a missionary for the Church of Jesus Christ of Latter-day Saints in the Netherlands and Belgium and graduated from Brigham Young University with a Bachelor of Arts degree in English and a master's degree in Accountancy. After college, Brown began working in the tech industry and continues to work in the ERP software sector as a business consultant and education manager. He currently lives in Laketown, Utah, a ranching environment that inspired one of the core ideas in his debut novel.

Writing career 
Brown explored writing as a student at BYU, studying with Darrell Spencer, Leslie Norris, Bruce Jorgensen, and Peter Macuck. After attending a transformational writing workshop offered by Dave Wolverton, he began to submit his stories for publication. In 1996 he won a quarterly first prize in the annual Writers of the Future contest and published his first piece of fiction. His short story "The Scent of Desire" appeared in the contest's 1997 anthology of winners under the pseudonym Bo Griffin.

In 2002 he attended his second pivotal workshop: Orson Scott Card's Literary Boot Camp. After that workshop, Brown began to turn again to writing for publication, this time focusing on novels. In 2008 he signed a three-book contract with Tor Books for an epic fantasy series which begins with Servant of a Dark God.

Bibliography

Thrillers

Epic Fantasy

Dark God series

The Drovers series

Science Fiction

Short stories 
"The Scent of Desire" (published under pen name Bo Griffin in )
"Loose in the Wires" (published in )
"Bright Waters" (published in )
"From the Clay of His Heart" (published in )

Nonfiction

Awards 
 1997 "The Scent of Desire": Writers of the Future, First Prize, 1997 (as Bo Griffin)
 2010 Servant of a Dark God: Whitney Awards, Best Speculative Fiction Novel 2009
 2021 Gun Runner: Dragon Awards, Best Military Science Fiction or Fantasy Novel 2021

Notes

External links
 John Brown's Official Web Site

20th-century Mormon missionaries
Brigham Young University alumni
American fantasy writers
American Mormon missionaries in the Netherlands
21st-century American novelists
American science fiction writers
Living people
Novelists from Utah
Latter Day Saints from California
People from Bountiful, Utah
American short story writers
American Mormon missionaries in Belgium
American male novelists
American male short story writers
1966 births
Latter Day Saints from Ohio
Latter Day Saints from Utah
People from Rich County, Utah
21st-century American male writers